Uzunboyad (also, Uzunboyat) is a village and municipality in the Davachi Rayon of Azerbaijan.  It has a population of 1,378.

References 

Populated places in Shabran District